The Spectre is a prominent rock spire,  high, near the center of Organ Pipe Peaks, Gothic Mountains, in Queen Maud Mountains in Antarctica. It was discovered in December 1934 by the Byrd Antarctic Expedition geological party under Quin Blackburn. The allusive name was suggested by Edmund Stump, leader of the United States Antarctic Research Program (USARP)-Arizona State University geological party in the Gothic Mountains, 1980–81.

References

Mountains of the Ross Dependency
Queen Maud Mountains